Eleonora Alverà (born November 26, 1982 in Cortina d'Ampezzo, Italy) is an Italian curler. She is a 2010 Italian women's champion.

She participated in the 2006 Winter Olympics, where the Italian team finished in tenth place.

Teams

Personal life
Her father Fabio is also an Italian curler and coach. He played at the 2006 Winter Olympics as a member of the Italian men's team. Her aunt (Fabio's sister) Claudio is an Italian champion curler. Her brother Alberto is also a curler.

References

External links
 

Living people
1982 births
People from Cortina d'Ampezzo
Italian female curlers
Olympic curlers of Italy
Curlers at the 2006 Winter Olympics
Italian curling champions
Sportspeople from the Province of Belluno